Edayyathu Mangalam Venkatarama Krishnamurthy (18 June 1934 – 26 October 2012) was an Indian-born computer scientist. He was a professor at the Department of Computer science, Indian Institute of Science, Bangalore.  He was an Emeritus Fellow, Computer Sciences Laboratory, Research School of Information Sciences and Engineering, Australian National University, Canberra.

He received the prestigious Shanti Swarup Bhatnagar Prize for Science and Technology (1978). He held several positions working for many institutions in India, Australia, USA, Europe and other nations.

References

 E.V. Krishnamurthy

1934 births
2012 deaths
People from Ariyalur district
Graph theorists
Academic staff of the Indian Institute of Science
Scientists from Tamil Nadu
Indian combinatorialists
Recipients of the Shanti Swarup Bhatnagar Award in Mathematical Science